Bruce John (born 20 July 1937) is an Australian former cricketer. He played two first-class matches for Tasmania between 1963 and 1964.

See also
 List of Tasmanian representative cricketers

References

External links
 

1937 births
Living people
Australian cricketers
Tasmania cricketers
Cricketers from Launceston, Tasmania